Saint-Just-sur-Viaur (literally Saint-Just on Viaur; Languedocien: Sent Just de Viaur) is a commune in the Aveyron department in southern France.

Geography
The river Céor flows into the Viaur in the commune.

Population

See also
Communes of the Aveyron department

References

Communes of Aveyron
Aveyron communes articles needing translation from French Wikipedia